Thomas Bordeleau (born January 3, 2002) is an American professional ice hockey forward for the San Jose Barracuda in the American Hockey League (AHL) as a prospect to the San Jose Sharks of the National Hockey League (NHL). He was drafted 38th overall by the Sharks in the 2020 NHL Entry Draft. His father is former NHL player Sébastien Bordeleau.

Early life
Bordeleau was born in Houston, Texas, to hockey player Sébastien Bordeleau and gynecologist Chantal Dubois while his dad played for the Houston Aeros. He then lived in Switzerland for ten years before moving to Terrebonne, Quebec after his dad retired in 2012.

Playing career

Junior
During the 2018–19 season, Bordeleau led the team in scoring, recording 16 goals and 23 assists in 56 games for the USA Hockey National Team Development Program of the United States Hockey League (USHL).

Collegiate
Bordeleau began his collegiate career for the Michigan Wolverines during the 2020–21 season. During his freshman season he led the nation in freshman scoring, and led the team in scoring with eight goals and 22 assists in 24 games. He recorded three game-winning goals and was a +18, the sixth-best on-ice rating in the Big Ten. He led the league in faceoff win percentage (.580), winning 211 draws. Following an outstanding season, he was named to the Big Ten All-Freshman Team, the All-Big Ten Second Team and was named Big Ten Freshman of the Year. He was also awarded the Tim Taylor Award.

During the 2021–22 season, in his sophomore year, he finished tied for fourth in points (37), fifth in goals (12) and third in assists (25).

Professional
On April 12, 2022, Bordeleau signed an amateur tryout contract with the Sharks' AHL affiliate, the San Jose Barracuda, for the remainder of the 2021–22 season. He made his professional debut for the Barracuda the next day and recorded three assists in his first career AHL game. On April 16, 2022, he signed a three-year, entry-level contact with the San Jose Sharks. The next day, he made his NHL debut in a 4–5 overtime loss to the Minnesota Wild, while also getting his first point by assisting a goal.

International play
Bordeleau was scheduled to represent the United States at the 2021 World Junior Ice Hockey Championships, however, he was cut from the roster due to COVID-19 protocols.

On May 5, 2022, Bordeleau was named to the United States men's national ice hockey team to compete at the 2022 IIHF World Championship. He recorded two goals in eight games.

Personal life
Thomas is the son of former professional ice hockey player Sébastien Bordeleau, and the grandson of Paulin Bordeleau. He holds American, Canadian, and French citizenship, and his first language is French.

Career statistics

Regular season and playoffs

International

Awards and honors

References

External links

2002 births
Living people
American men's ice hockey centers
Michigan Wolverines men's ice hockey players
San Jose Barracuda players
San Jose Sharks draft picks
San Jose Sharks players
Sportspeople from Houston
USA Hockey National Team Development Program players
American people of Canadian descent
21st-century American people